Live: You Get What You Play For is a live album by rock band REO Speedwagon, released as a double-LP in 1977 (and years later as a single CD omitting "Gary's Guitar Solo" and "Little Queenie"). It was recorded at Soldiers and Sailors Memorial Building in Kansas City, Kansas, the Convention Center in Indianapolis, Indiana, Kiel Auditorium in Saint Louis, Missouri and Alex Cooley's Electric Ballroom in Atlanta, Georgia. It peaked at number #72 on the Billboard 200 chart in 1977. The song "Ridin' the Storm Out" reached #94 on Billboard's Hot 100 chart, but has since become a classic rock radio staple. The album went platinum on December 14, 1978.

The Japanese CD reissue, released in 2011, restores the album and songs to its original full length by including both "Gary's Guitar Solo" and "Little Queenie", which were omitted in the original single CD release due to time constraints. Sony Music also released the unedited double LP Epic master on its Legacy Label for Compact Disc in 2011 as well.

Track listing
All songs written by Gary Richrath, except where noted.

Side one 
"Like You Do"  – 6:43
"Lay Me Down" (Neal Doughty, Alan Gratzer, Terry Luttrell, Gregg Philbin, Richrath)  – 3:34
"Any Kind of Love"  – 3:33
"Being Kind (Can Hurt Someone Sometimes)" (Kevin Cronin)  – 6:27

Side two
"Keep Pushin'" (Cronin)  – 3:59
"(Only A) Summer Love"  – 6:06
"Son of a Poor Man"  – 5:25
"(I Believe) Our Time Is Gonna Come" (Cronin)  – 4:46

Side three
"Flying Turkey Trot"  – 2:34
"Gary's Guitar Solo"+  – 6:10
"157 Riverside Avenue (Doughty, Gratzer, Luttrell, Philbin, Richrath)  – 7:35
"Ridin' the Storm Out"  – 5:34

Side four Encores
"Music Man" (Cronin)  – 2:29
"Little Queenie"+ (Chuck Berry)  – 4:45
"Golden Country"  – 8:12
Total length  – 77:18

(+) Appeared on the original double-LP release of the album, but omitted from the original single CD release. They are included on the 2011 Japanese "remaster" two-CD release.

Personnel
Kevin Cronin – lead vocals (except on "Only a Summer Love"), rhythm guitar
Gary Richrath – lead guitar, lead vocals on "Any Kind of Love" and "Only a Summer Love"
Neal Doughty – keyboards
Gregg Philbin – bass, backing vocals
Alan Gratzer – drums, backing vocals

Production
Production as listed in album liner notes.
John Stronach - production, engineering
John Henning - production, engineering, mixing
Gary Richrath - production, mixing
Bruce Hensal - engineering
Pete Carlson - engineering
Jack Crymes - engineering
Kelly Kotera - engineering
Rick Sanchez - engineering
Mike Klink - engineering
Vartán Kurjian - illustration
Justin Carroll - illustration
Tom Steele - design
Lorrie Sullivan - photography

Charts

Album

Singles

Certifications

Release history

Notes

References

REO Speedwagon albums
1977 live albums
Epic Records live albums
Albums produced by Gary Richrath